Moliendo café is an album by Italian singer Mina, issued in 1962.

"Moliendo café" is the cover of a song written by Hugo Blanco in 1958 (see Moliendo Café).

"Chi sarà" is the Italian version of the Spanish mambo song "¿Quién será?", composed by Pablo Beltrán Ruiz in 1953.

The track "Giochi d'ombre" was the main theme song of the film Leoni al sole, directed by Vittorio Caprioli in 1961.

Track listing

Side A

Side B

1962 albums
Mina (Italian singer) albums
Italian-language albums